A writ for the election of the 2nd General Assembly of Nova Scotia was issued on August 23, 1759.  The assembly convened on December 4, 1759, held two sessions, and was dissolved by the death of King George II on October 25, 1760.

Sessions
Dates of specific sessions are under research.

Governor and Council
Governor: Charles Lawrence -died in office 19 October 1760.
Lieutenant Governor: vacant
Administrator: Jonathan Belcher served as acting governor after Lawrence's death

The members of the Council are currently under research.

House of Assembly

Officers
Speaker of the House: William Nesbitt of Halifax County
Clerk of the House: Archibald Hinshelwood of Lunenburg County

Division of seats
Five counties were created after the 1st assembly was dissolved, and were granted two seats each.  In addition, Halifax and Lunenburg Townships retained their 4 and 2 seats, respectively.  The Townships of Annapolis, Horton, and Cumberland were also granted 2 seats each, for a total of 22 seats.  Horton failed to elect its members.

Members

Annapolis County
Jonathan Hoar
Isaac Deschamps
Annapolis Township
Erasmus James Philipps -died Sept. 26, 1760.
John Newton
Cumberland County
Winckworth Tonge
Simon Slocomb
Cumberland Township
Joseph Frye
John Huston
Halifax County
William Nesbitt
Henry Newton
Halifax Township
Malachy Salter
Jonathan Binney
John Burbidge
Benjamin Gerrish
Horton Township
did not elect its two members
Kings County
Joseph Scott
Charles Procter
Lunenburg County
Michael Francklin
Archibald Hinshelwood
Lunenburg Township
Sebastian Zouberbuhler
Philip Knaut

Note:  Unless otherwise noted, members were elected at the general election, and took their seats at the convening of the assembly.  By-elections are special elections held to fill specific vacancies.  When a member is noted as having taking their seat on a certain date, but a by-election isn't noted, the member was elected at the general election but arrived late.

References 
Bourinot, John George Builders of Nova Scotia : a historical review, with an appendix containing copies of rare documents relating to the early days of the province (1899) p. 146

02
1759 in Canada
1760 in Canada
1759 establishments in Nova Scotia
1760 disestablishments in Nova Scotia